Édouard Kabamba-Wenze (born 24 January 1987 in Kinshasa, Democratic Republic of the Congo) is a Belgian footballer, who last played for Melilla.

Club career

Standard Liège
Kabamba has been with Standard Liège since 2003. He debuted for the Liège club in February 2007 for the Belgian Pro League and on 9 August 2008 in the Belgian Super Cup against RSC Anderlecht from the municipality of Anderlecht in central Belgium.

Real Madrid
During the 2008–2009 season, he played as a striker on loan for Real Madrid Castilla, the reserve team of Real Madrid CF, where he played 2 games for the Castilla, scoring 0 goals. On average, he played 76 minutes per game in 37 games. He received five yellow cards and zero red cards.

Position
Kabamba is a versatile player he can play as right wing, left wing or midfielder.

Statistics

Honours

Club 
Standard Liège

 Belgian Pro League: 2007–08
 Belgian Supercup: 2008

References

External links
 

Living people
1987 births
Footballers from Kinshasa
Real Madrid Castilla footballers
Belgian footballers
Standard Liège players
UD Melilla footballers
Democratic Republic of the Congo emigrants to Belgium
K.A.S. Eupen players
Association football forwards